Marcelo Hennemann (born 11 March 1962) is a former professional tennis player from Brazil.

Career
Hennemann qualified for his only Grand Slam tournament at the 1988 French Open, where he beat fellow qualifier Stéphane Grenier in the first round. He was beaten in the second round by Thomas Muster.

He was more successful on the doubles circuit than as a singles player, winning two Challenger doubles titles.

The Novo Hamburgo born player was a doubles semi-finalist with Ivan Kley at the 1987 Athens Open and a doubles quarter-finalist partnering José Clavet at Palermo in 1988.

Challenger titles

Doubles: (2)

References

1962 births
Living people
Brazilian male tennis players
People from Novo Hamburgo
Sportspeople from Rio Grande do Sul
20th-century Brazilian people
21st-century Brazilian people